Coleophora motacillella is a moth of the family Coleophoridae. It is found from France to southern Russia and from Denmark to Austria and Romania.

Adults are on wing in July and August.

The larvae feed on Chenopodium and Atriplex species. They feed on the generative organs of their host plant.

References

motacillella
Moths described in 1849
Moths of Europe